Tommy Andreas Wargh (born December 19, 1986, in Örnsköldsvik) is a Swedish ice hockey player, he played with Molot-Prikamye Perm of the Russian Supreme League before signing with HC Yugra of the Kontinental Hockey League.

Career 
On 16 July 2009 left Modo Hockey of the Elitserien and joined to Molot-Prikamye Perm, he signed a one-year contract. 
In 2013 Wargh joined Swedish team Björklöven IF.

References

External links

1986 births
HIFK (ice hockey) players
Living people
Modo Hockey players
Molot-Prikamye Perm players
People from Örnsköldsvik Municipality
Swedish ice hockey defencemen
Sportspeople from Västernorrland County